TPBank is a bank of Vietnam.  It was founded on 5 May 2008, TPBank inherits technological expertise and financial strength from its strategic shareholders, including DOJI Gold and Gems Group, FPT Corporation, MobiFone Corporation, Vietnam National Reinsurance and SBI Ven Holding Pte. Ltd, Singapore.

History
The bank was founded in 2008 in cooperation with the Bank for Investment and Development of Vietnam, and Citibank. Branches in Ha Noi and Ho Chi Minh City were opened the same year, along with internet banking services and 'MiniBank 24/7', an automated banking system.  TienPhong is planning expansion to Hai Phong, Da Nang and Can Tho and elsewhere, in 2009.

See also
List of banks in Vietnam

References

External links
  TPbankofficial site

Banks of Vietnam
Banks established in 2008